Charlotte Ann Roberts, FBA (born 25 May 1957) is a British archaeologist, academic and former nurse. She is a bioarchaeologist and palaeopathologist, whose research focuses on health and the evolution of infectious disease in humans. From 2004 to 2020, she was Professor of Archaeology at Durham University: she is now professor emeritus.

Early life and education 
Roberts was born on 25 May 1957 in Harrogate, West Riding of Yorkshire, England. She trained as a nurse at St James's University Hospital in Leeds, becoming a State Registered Nurse (SRN) in 1978. She then worked as a staff nurse on the burns unit of St Lawrence Hospital, Chepstow.

In 1979, Roberts left her nursing career and matriculated into the University of Leicester to study archaeology. She graduated in 1982 with a Bachelor of Arts (BA Hons) degree. She had originally intended to return to nursing after completing her degree, but instead continued to study archaeology. From 1982 to 1983, she studied environmental archaeology and palaeoeconomy at the University of Sheffield, graduating with a Master of Arts (MA) degree. She undertook postgraduate research in bioarchaeology, palaeopathology and medical history on a part-time basis at the University of Bradford, and completed her Doctor of Philosophy (PhD) degree in 1988. Her doctoral thesis was titled "Trauma and its treatment in British antiquity: An osteoarchaeological study of macroscopic and radiological features of long bone fractures from the historic period with a comparative study of clinical radiographs".

Academic career 
From 1983 to 1988, Roberts was a research assistant at the University of Bradford "on a project focusing on human remains". She was appointed a lecturer in palaeopathology in 1989 and made a senior lecturer in medical anthropology in 1994. While at Bradford, she supervised Mary Lewis' doctoral thesis. In 2000, she moved to Durham University where she had been appointed Reader in Archaeology. She was appointed Professor of Archaeology in 2004. She was also a Leverhulme Trust Senior Research Fellow from 2006 to 2008, and a Nuffield Foundation Research Fellow from 2006 to 2007. She retired in October 2020, and was appointed professor emeritus.

Roberts is deputy editor of the International Journal of Paleopathology. She was president of the Paleopathology Association from 2011 to 2013. From 2010 to 2014, she served as a member of the Geography, Environmental Studies and Archaeology sub-panel for the Research Excellence Framework (REF 2014). In 2015, she was elected president of the British Association of Biological Anthropology and Osteoarchaeology (BABAO); she will serve a three-year term.

She led the research on the 7th and 8th century Bowl Hole cemetery at Bamburgh Castle.

Personal life 
In 2003, Roberts married Stewart James Gardner. She is a member of the Women's Institute (WI).

Honours 
In July 2014, Roberts was elected a Fellow of the British Academy, the UK's national academy for the humanities and the social sciences.

Selected works

References

External links 
 Durham University profile
 "Meet The Archaeologist: Charlotte Roberts" Interview with Archaeosoup Productions

1957 births
Living people
People from Harrogate
British women nurses
British archaeologists
Paleopathologists
British women archaeologists
Alumni of the University of Leicester
Alumni of the University of Sheffield
Alumni of the University of Bradford
Academics of the University of Bradford
Academics of Durham University
Fellows of the British Academy
Bioarchaeologists